Aleksandar Petrović is a Macedonian professional basketball coach. His last team as head coach was MZT Skopje of the Macedonian League and Adriatic League.

References

External links

Living people
Macedonian basketball coaches
Macedonian people of Serbian descent
1972 births